Skylar Laine (born Skylar Laine Harden; February 1, 1994) is an American singer from Brandon, Mississippi. She placed fifth on the eleventh season of American Idol.

Early life
Laine was raised in Brandon, Mississippi and graduated from Brandon High School a year early. Her musical influences are Miranda Lambert, Waylon Jennings and George Jones. Laine also worked at her family's business in Mississippi. She has also lived in Nashville, Tennessee.

American Idol

 Overview 
Laine auditioned in Houston, Texas. In the semi-finals she performed "Stay with Me" by Faces.  She was one of the top five female vote getters and advanced to the top 13. She is the second finalist from Mississippi, the other being Jasmine Murray from American Idol season 8. After the competition, she moved to Nashville, Tennessee.

Performances/results

 When Ryan Seacrest announced the results for this particular night, Laine was among the Bottom 3, but was declared safe first.
 Due to the judges using their one save on Jessica Sanchez, the Top 7 remained intact for another week.

Post Idol
She took part in the American Idols LIVE! Tour 2012, which began July 6, 2012 and ran till September 21, 2012.

It was announced on November 17, 2012 that Laine had signed with 19 Entertainment's management and had moved to Nashville, Tennessee to work on her debut album. She has worked with songwriters such as Nathan Chapman, Brett James, Hillary Lindsey, Luke Laird, and Chris Tompkins. She also debuted an original song called "Settle Down," written by herself, Chris DeStefano and Anne Preven. In January 2013, she left 19 Entertainment's management because they were unable to find a record label for her, but she was still working on her album.

On July 10, 2015, her debut album, Dirt Covered Lace, was released.

Discography
 Albums Dirt Covered Lace (2015)Extended plays

References

External links
 Official Website
 Skylar Laine on American Idol''
 

1994 births
Living people
21st-century American singers
American women country singers
American country rock singers
American country singer-songwriters
American Idol participants
Singer-songwriters from Mississippi
American child singers
21st-century American women singers
Country musicians from Mississippi